84–86 is a double compilation album released by the industrial music band KMFDM in 2004. The album's 27 tracks on two compact discs were recorded from 1984 to 1986 but previously unreleased on CD. Certain noted selections have never been released at all prior to this album. Personnel featured on this recording include Sascha Konietzko, En Esch Jr. Blackmail, Nico Blank, "Tamsi" Tamsjadi, and several others.

A cassette release of these tracks was assembled by En Esch and made available through the KMFDM Enterprises mailorder catalog in 1992. It included the first 19 tracks appearing on the CD release, but several tracks were dubbed at an incorrect tape speed (later fixed on the CD as "official" versions). These tracks were available for download at the KMFDM Store prior to the actual release of 84–86.  The CD was sold on the band's 20th anniversary tour in October and November 2004.

Track listing

Official release

1992 KMFDM Enterprises mailorder cassette release

Note: Tracks 3, 4, 9, and 13 are different versions on the cassette than on the official CD release.

Personnel
 Sascha Konietzko
 En Esch
 Rudolf Naomi
 Nico Blank
 Sintawati Tamsjadi
 Jr. Blackmail
 Tom Oz
 Willi Knop
 EASi

References

KMFDM compilation albums
2004 compilation albums